SS Assyrian was a cargo ship that was built in Hamburg for German owners in 1914, transferred to British owners in 1920 as war reparations and sunk by a U-boat in 1940. She was launched as MS Fritz, and when she changed owners in 1920 she was renamed MS Assyrian. She had been built as a motor ship but in 1925 she was converted to a steamship and became SS Assyrian.

From MS Fritz to SS Assyrian
Blohm + Voss of Hamburg built the ship, completing her as MS Fritz in August 1914 for Woermann-Linie, who registered her in Hamburg. In 1919 she was designated for war reparations and in 1920 she was acquired by the British Ellerman and Papayanni Lines, who renamed her Assyrian and registered her in Liverpool.

In 1925 Ellerman's had her converted from diesel to steam propulsion with a pair of three-cylinder triple-expansion steam engines built by Cooper and Greig of Dundee, Scotland and rated at a combined power output of 280 NHP.

Second World War career
Within weeks of the UK entering the Second World War, Assyrian was sailing in convoys, starting with Convoy OA 7 in September 1939 which assembled off the coast of Southend and dispersed in the North Atlantic. Assyrian continued to Gibraltar, where she joined Convoy Green 4. Green 4 was bound for Port Said in Egypt, but Assyrian sailed with it only as far as Malta. From December 1939 until May 1940 she worked between Gibraltar and Liverpool, making outward voyages from Liverpool to Gibraltar in Convoy OG 15 in January and Convoy OG 24 in April.

Assyrian was then transferred to transatlantic convoys between the UK and Canada, starting with Convoy OB 162 from Liverpool in June 1940 and returning the next month in Convoy HX 55 from Halifax, Nova Scotia. In August she went to the US, sailing with Convoy OB 195 from Liverpool until it dispersed at sea.

Final voyage and sinking

In September 1940 Assyrian loaded 3,700 tons of grain and sailed from New Orleans to Bermuda, where she joined Convoy BHX 77 to Halifax. There BHX 77 joined Convoy HX 77 to Liverpool, but Assyrian went to Sydney, Nova Scotia where she joined Convoy SC 7, which left for Liverpool on 5 October. Assyrians Master was Reginald Kearon and she carried the convoy commodore, retired vice admiral Lachlan Mackinnon.

At first the convoy had only one escort ship, the  sloop . A wolf pack of U-boats found the convoy on 16 October and quickly overwhelmed it, sinking many ships over the next few days. On 19 October, as the convoy was in the Western Approaches, a U-boat was sighted 100 yards ahead of Assyrian. She went full ahead to ram her, making  for the first time in her career. She chased the enemy ship for 40 minutes but her main gun was astern and she was unable to bring any of her small guns to bear. The U-boat eventually escaped, leaving Assyrian ahead of the convoy and unescorted.

At 0122 hours U-101 fired three bow torpedoes at the convoy, followed two minutes later by a stern torpedo. Frauenheim later reported four hits and four ships sunk.

In fact two of the bow torpedoes missed, but one hit Assyrian on her starboard side, stopping her engines and putting out her lights. U-101s stern torpedo hit the cargo ship . Both of Assyrians lifeboats were damaged in the explosion and most of the surviving crew took to the life-rafts. A sinking merchant ship drifted down upon Assyrian, her cargo of pit props rolling off and further damaging Assyrian and sinking one of the life-rafts. A small party including Captain Kearon, his Chief Officer and Admiral Mackinnon were stranded aboard the sinking ship. They made a raft from whatever they could find and launched it as Assyrian sank. The raft disintegrated as it hit the water, but most of the occupants managed to cling to pieces of wreckage.

Out of a complement of 51, 17 were killed: 15 crew members and two Royal Navy personnel. The   rescued 34 survivors: her Master, the Commodore, three Royal Navy personnel, 20 crew members and nine passengers and landed them at Liverpool. Captain Kearon was awarded Lloyd's War Medal for Bravery at Sea and the OBE.

References

 

1914 ships
Maritime incidents in October 1940
Ships built in Hamburg
Ships of the Ellerman Lines
Ships sunk by German submarines in World War II
Steamships of the United Kingdom
World War I merchant ships of Germany
World War II merchant ships of the United Kingdom
World War II shipwrecks in the Atlantic Ocean